Xiao Yiming (born ) is a Chinese individual rhythmic gymnast. She represents China at international competitions. She competed at the 2005 and  2007 World Rhythmic Gymnastics Championships. She had her highest placement finishing 19th in All-around at the 2005 World Championships in Baku, Azerbaijan.

References

1988 births
Living people
Chinese rhythmic gymnasts
Place of birth missing (living people)
Asian Games bronze medalists for China
Medalists at the 2006 Asian Games
Asian Games medalists in gymnastics
Gymnasts at the 2006 Asian Games
21st-century Chinese women